Nothopanus noctilucens is a species of agaric fungus in the family Marasmiaceae.  Found in Japan, the fruit bodies of the fungus are bioluminescent.

See also
List of bioluminescent fungi

References

External links

Marasmiaceae
Bioluminescent fungi
Fungi described in 1844
Fungi of Asia
Taxa named by Joseph-Henri Léveillé